Spyglass Hill Golf Course is a links golf course on the west coast of the United States, located on the Monterey Peninsula in California.  The course is part of the Pebble Beach Company, which also owns the Pebble Beach Golf Links, The Links at Spanish Bay, and the Del Monte Golf Course.

Golf Digest has ranked Spyglass Hill as high as fifth on its list of "America's 100 Greatest Public Courses". It has also featured in the popular Tiger Woods PGA Tour series of video games, along with sister course Pebble Beach.

History
Spyglass Hill was designed by Robert Trent Jones Sr., and opened  on March 11, 1966, after six years of planning, design, and construction. Since 1967, it has been in the rotation of the multi-course AT&T Pebble Beach Pro-Am, a February tournament on the West Coast Swing of the PGA Tour.

Originally called Pebble Beach Pines Golf Club, it was renamed to Spyglass Hill by Samuel F. B. Morse (1885–1969), the founder of Pebble Beach Company, after the place in the 1883 novel Treasure Island by Robert Louis Stevenson (1850–1894), who had spent time in the Monterey area in 1879. All the holes at Spyglass Hill were named by Bob Hanna after characters and places from the novel.

Its par-72 layout measures  from the championship (blue) tees, with a course rating of 75.4 and a slope rating of 145. The first five holes all have views of the Pacific Ocean, and the other thirteen wind through the Del Monte Forest.

The course record of 62 (–10) was set by Phil Mickelson in 2005 and equaled by Luke Donald the next year; both were carded on Thursday of the AT&T under calm conditions.

The back tees at Spyglass Hill were called "Tiger tees" when it opened, long before the birth of Tiger Woods.

Layout
The first hole is called Treasure Island, and is a downhill  par 5, which doglegs almost 90 degrees to the left. One of the more renowned holes is the fourth, a  par 4 named Blind Pew, which Robert Trent Jones called his favorite par 4. The green is the most photographed on the course, and is surrounded by ice plant. Other hole names include The Black Spot (3rd), Captain Flint (10th), and Long John Silver (14th).

Scorecard

References

External links

Spyglass Hill Golf Course: Course information with photos and interactive map.

Golf clubs and courses in California
Sports venues in Monterey County, California
Golf clubs and courses designed by Robert Trent Jones
Pebble Beach, California
1966 establishments in California
Sports venues completed in 1966